Baningli is a village in the commune of Bassila in the Donga Department of western Benin.

See also
Baningime

External links
Satellite map at Maplandia

Populated places in the Donga Department
Commune of Bassila